Telephone numbers in the United Arab Emirates (UAE) follow a closed telephone numbering plan. The UAE is assigned an international dialing code of +971 by ITU-T. Telephone numbers are fixed at seven digits, with area codes fixed at two or three digits.

Area Codes

Before 2000
Subscriber numbers were 5- or 6- digits, with area code plus subscriber number totalling 7 digits.

Current
The overall structure of the UAE's national numbering plan is:

Landline numbers begin with:
01 Al Karama (Canceled)
02 Abu Dhabi
03 Al Ain
04 Dubai
06 Sharjah, Ajman and Umm al-Quwain
07 Ras Al Khaimah
08 Western Region (Liwa, etc.)
09 Fujairah

Mobile numbers begin with:
050 cell phones (Etisalat)
052 cell phones (Du)
054 cell phones (Etisalat)  (Recently released for public use.)
055 cell phones (Du)
056 cell phones (Etisalat)
058 cell phones (Du/Virgin Mobile) (Recently released for public use.)

Emergency Numbers 
The following numbers are used for emergency services within the UAE:
 999 - Police (Emergency)
 901 (in Dubai) - Police (Non-emergency)
 998 - Ambulance
 997 - Fire Department (Civil Defence)
 996 - Coast Guard
 991 - Electricity failure (DEWA)
 922 - Water failure (DEWA)

Special numbers
These are special 7-digit number ranges, and have no associated area code):

 200xxxx  shared cost services
 600xxxxxx shared cost services
 800xxx(xxxx) 

(800 + min. 3 digits)

References

United Arab Emirates
Telecommunications in the United Arab Emirates
Telephone numbers